The cloud forest tree frog (Megastomatohyla nubicola) is a species of frog in the family Hylidae endemic to Mexico. Its natural habitats are subtropical or tropical moist montane forests and rivers. It is threatened by habitat loss.

 described the species in 1964; he placed it in the genus Hyla. The specific name, nubicola, Latin for "sky-dwelling", refers to its habitat being a cloud forest. It was transferred to Megastomatohyla upon that genus's circumscription in 2005.

References

External links

 

Megastomatohyla
Amphibians described in 1964
Amphibians of Mexico
Taxonomy articles created by Polbot